Tom Triplett (March 11, 1935 – June 23, 2006) was an American politician. He served as a Democratic member for the 128th district of the Georgia House of Representatives.

Life and career 
Triplett was born in Watauga County, North Carolina. He attended Bluefield University and served in the United States Air Force.

Triplett was mayor of Port Wentworth, Georgia. In 1971, he was elected to represent the 128th district of the Georgia House of Representatives. He served until 1991, when he was succeeded by Sonny Dixon.

Triplett died in June 2006 of cancer, at the age of 71.

References 

1935 births
2006 deaths
People from Watauga County, North Carolina
Democratic Party members of the Georgia House of Representatives
20th-century American politicians
Mayors of places in Georgia (U.S. state)